Timothy H. Johnson is an American politician serving as a member of the Kansas House of Representatives from the 38th district. Elected in November 2020, he assumed office on January 11, 2021.

Education 
Johnson earned a Bachelor of Arts degree in education from Bethany College, a Master of Science in administration of justice from Wichita State University, and a Master of Education from Pittsburg State University.

Career 
Johnson worked as a teacher at Basehor-Linwood High School and Wyandotte High School. He also served as a special investigator for the state of Kansas and as director of public safety for Lindsborg, Kansas. Johnson was elected to the Kansas House of Representatives in November 2020 and assumed office on January 11, 2021.

Committee assignments
K-12 Education Budget
Veterans and Military 
Children and Seniors

References 

Living people
Bethany College (Kansas) alumni
Wichita State University alumni
Pittsburg State University alumni
Republican Party members of the Kansas House of Representatives
21st-century American politicians
Year of birth missing (living people)